Cement Heads is an American reality television series airing on A&E.  The series premiered on August 12, 2014, and stars the Lougheed family, cement contractors in New York City. It is produced by Matador Content.

The series centers on the misadventures of a family-run business. One distinctive aspect of the program is that the fourth wall is frequently broken as the Lougheed family interacts with the producers and crew.

References

External links
 
 

2010s American reality television series
2014 American television series debuts
English-language television shows
A&E (TV network) original programming
Television series by Matador Content
Cement
Television shows set in New York City